Daryell Nowlan (born June 4, 1969 in Lahr, West Germany) is a Canadian curler and curling coach from Moncton, New Brunswick. He is originally from Summerside, Prince Edward Island. He currently coaches the Andrea Crawford rink.

Career
In juniors, Nowlan represented Prince Edward Island three times at Canadian Junior Curling Championships from 1986–1988. He went 4–7 in 1986 as second for James McCarthy and 3–8 in both in 1987 and in 1988 as third for McCarthy.

Nowlan made his first Tim Hortons Brier appearance in 1994 at the 1994 Labatt Brier in Red Deer, Alberta. He was the alternate for the PEI rink skipped by Mike Gaudet. They finished last with a 2–9 record. Nowlan didn't play in any games. He would then move to New Brunswick and join the James Grattan rink as second. This team won the New Brunswick provincial championship in 1997 and represented NB at the 1997 Labatt Brier. They had a fast start, winning 5 out of their first 6 games eventually qualifying for the playoffs with an 8–3 record. They defeated Ontario's Ed Werenich 6–4 in the 3 vs 4 game before falling to Manitoba's Vic Peters in the semifinal, settling for bronze.

Coaching
Nowlan has coached teams at the Scotties, Brier, Canadian Juniors, Under 18's and the World juniors. Some notable people he has coached include Andrea Crawford, Russ Howard, Charley Thomas, James Grattan and Kim Dolan.

Personal life
Nowlan is the Vice president at the Atlantic Canada Opportunities Agency. He has two sons, Josh and Jacob who he coached at the 2019 Canadian U18 Curling Championships.

Teams

References

External links

Curlers from New Brunswick
Living people
Sportspeople from Moncton
1969 births
Canadian male curlers
Curlers from Prince Edward Island
People from Summerside, Prince Edward Island
Canadian curling coaches